Hoërskool Strand is an Afrikaans high school located in Strand, South Africa. 1 089 students attend the school, mostly residents of Strand, although students from as far as Gordon's Bay, Somerset West, and even Grabouw attend the school. The school is the major provider of secondary education in the area and is headmastered by Mr Danie Malan, that took the lead from former headmaster Mr Christiaan Klopper.
With the post-war growth of the Hottentots Holland district, in 1962 a second High School (Afrikaans medium) was opened, which mainly served the Strand.

Hoërskool Strand has four quarters in a school year, from January to December. The school provides classes from grade eight to grade twelve (the latter also known as matric).

Sport
Hoërskool Strand competes in inter-schools activities with neighbouring schools Parel Vallei High School and Hottentots Holland High School. They also compete against tour groups, such as the Bablake School from England, which last toured Strand in mid-2010. The sports in which it competes include rugby, cricket, hockey, netball, squash, tennis and chess. Sports activities which are not limited to inter-school competition include swimming and surfing.

The school also has a strong academical focus, but it is considered by most to be concentrating on excelling in the sports-world. A school rule requiring students to take part in at least one winter-  and one summer activity, introduced at the beginning of 2006, is evidence of the school's goal to become a sport power within the school circles in the area. They succeeded in winning the winter-interschools again in 2006 by beating Hottentots Holland in the main rugby match of the day.

On 14 October 2006, the school sent a year 11 student, Corné Blaauw, to compete in the World Junior Chess Championship which was held in Georgia.

Academic
Academically the school also excels on national front.

The school provides a wide variety of subjects to its students, however the students are required to take the default list of subjects in grade 8 and 9, with the option to take English as a first language.
Students can also take German as a second additional language. Grade 9 students have the opportunity to choose between Arts and Culture as subject, or the alternative of Music, Dramatic Arts or Art.

Here is a list of the subjects:
Language, Literacy and Communication
Afrikaans First Language
English First Language
English Second Language
Mathematical Literacy, Mathematics and Mathematical Sciences
Mathematics; or
Mathematical Literacy
Additional mathematics
General Sciences
Physical Sciences
Biology
Human and Social Sciences
History
Geography
Economics
Accounting
Business Economics
Information Technology (Done at Hottentots Holland High, as appointed by the WCED)
Computer Literacy
Computer Sciences
Technology
Engineering Graphics and Design
Home Economics
Technology
Life Orientation
Life Skills and Psychology
Arts and Cultures
Visual art
Cultural Studies
Art History
Music
Practical and theory
Dramatic Arts
Other
German Second Additional Language
Tourism

Some of the subjects require minimum entry qualifications.

Exchange system
The school is very active in exchanging students with the Burgerschool in Roeselare in Flanders, (Belgium), due to the language similarities between Afrikaans and Dutch which makes communication much easier. Students can also visit schools in Germany, Switzerland and Argentina. Exchange students visiting the school come from Belgium, England, Germany and Italy. England and Italy however mainly provide sport tour groups. The exchange students from Germany go there through FSA Youth Exchange.

The current 2012–2013 Strand High Exchange students sent to the Burgerschool, is the first exchange group to visit four different locations, viz. England, Belgium, the Netherlands and France.

Societies
Strand High is proud to have several societies that is interactive with the community, all of which are operated by the students, and supervised by educators who have been assigned to the society.

FUEL 
Faithful Until Eternal Life, abbreviated FUEL, is a Christian youth organisation at the school.

Ti Amo 
Ti Amo (Love It.), is a student-run organisation, which started in 2005 as a division of the council of Student Affairs. It later parted from the Student Council and became an organisation on its own. The organisation chooses five non-profit community organisations to serve every year.

Suidooster 
Named after the wind-direction that makes the Strand famous, the Suidooster newspaper is the official school newspaper, with an all-student editorial board, and two educators as head editors. The journalists chosen every year to serve the newspaper, are year 10 to year 11 students. Since the third school term of 2012, articles are published on the school newspaper.

References

External links 
 Official website
 Alumni site
 Suidooster, the school newspaper

Boarding schools in South Africa
Schools in the Western Cape
Educational institutions established in 1963
1963 establishments in South Africa
Afrikaans-language schools